Léon Cladel (Montauban, 22 March 1834 – 21 July 1892, Sèvres) was a French novelist.

The son of an artisan, he studied law at Toulouse and became a solicitor's clerk in Paris. Cladel made a limited reputation by his first book, Les Martyrs ridicules (1862), a novel for which Charles Baudelaire, whose literary disciple Cladel was, wrote a preface. He then returned to his native district of Quercy in southwestern France, where he produced a series of stories of peasant life in Eral le dompteur (1865), Le Nomm Qouael (1868) and other volumes, similar to the works of Émile Pouvillon. Returning to Paris he published the two novels which are generally acknowledged as his best work, Le Bouscassié (1869) and La Fête votive de Saint-Bartholomée Porte-Glaive (1872). Une Maudite (1876) was judged dangerous to public morals and cost its author a month's imprisonment. Other works by Cladel are Les Va-nu-pieds (1873), a volume of short stories; N'a-qu'un-oeil (1882), Urbains et ruraux (1884), Gueux de marque (1887), and the posthumous Juive errante (1897). He died in Sèvres on 21 July 1892.

References

 La Vie de Léon Cladel (Paris, 1905), by his daughter Judith Cladel, containing also an article on Cladel by Edmond Picard, a complete list of his works, and of the critical articles on his work.
New General Catalog of Old Books and Authors 
 The Symbolist Movement in Literature (1919), Arthur Symons

1835 births
1892 deaths
People from Montauban
Burials at Père Lachaise Cemetery
19th-century French novelists
French male novelists
19th-century French male writers